The 1985 Iowa Hawkeyes football team represented the University of Iowa in the 1985 Big Ten Conference football season. The Hawkeyes were led by seventh-year head coach Hayden Fry and played their home games at Kinnick Stadium in Iowa City, Iowa.

Chuck Long declared that he would return for his senior season. He became an instant Heisman Trophy candidate, and Iowa was a preseason top five team. After three weeks in 1985, the Hawkeyes ascended to No. 1 in the national rankings for the second time in team history (1960).
Three weeks later, in the sixth game of the season, No. 1 Iowa faced No. 2 Michigan at Kinnick Stadium. Iowa trailed 10–9 as the Hawkeyes regained possession of the football at their own 22-yard line with just 5:27 remaining in the game. Long drove the Iowa team to the 12-yard line with two seconds remaining to set up kicker Rob Houghtlin's game-winning field goal as time expired. After a rout of Northwestern, the Hawkeyes were upset by the No. 8 Ohio State Buckeyes in Columbus, Ohio. The loss to Ohio State cost Iowa their No. 1 ranking, but the Hawkeyes still won the Big Ten title outright for the first time in 27 years.

Long won a number of major national awards, including the Maxwell Award, given to the nation's top player and the Davey O'Brien Award, given to the nation's top quarterback, and the Chicago Tribune Silver Football as the top player in the Big Ten. He was a consensus first-team selection to the 1985 College Football All-America Team and the runner-up for the Heisman Trophy to Bo Jackson of Auburn, losing by just 45 points.

Iowa lost Long's final game, the 1986 Rose Bowl, to UCLA by a score of 45–28. Long's Iowa teams compiled a 35–13–1 record. He graduated with 10,461 passing yards and 74 touchdowns on 782 completions.

Schedule

Roster

Rankings

Game summaries

Drake

Source: Box score and Game story

Northern Illinois

Source: Box score and Game story
    
    
    
    
    
    
    
    
    
    
    

Senior WR Bill Happel had a big day with 207 yards receiving and 3 touchdowns. The yardage total marked the first time a Hawkeye had more than 200 yards receiving in a single game and stood as the school record for two years.

at Iowa State

Source: Box score and Game story
    
    
    
    
    
    
    
    
    
    
    

The Hawkeyes earned the third of 15 consecutive wins over their in-state rivals. To date, this remains the largest margin of victory in the series. The convincing win vaulted Iowa to the #1 ranking in the country, a spot they would occupy for five consecutive weeks.

Michigan State

Source: Box score and Game story
    
    
    
    
    
    
    
    
    
    

In their first game since ascending to the #1 ranking, the Hawkeyes survived a wild, back and forth thriller. The teams combined for well over 1,000 yards of total offense. Chuck Long (30-39, 380 yards, 4 TD) scored the winning touchdown on a 2-yard bootleg with 27 seconds remaining.

at Wisconsin

Source: Box score and Game story

No. 2 Michigan

Source: Box score and Game story

    
    
    
    
    
    

The #1 Hawkeyes dominated the game statistically — holding major advantages in total yards (422-182), offensive plays (84-41), and time of possession (38:05-21:55) — but could not find the end zone. Rob Houghtlin kicked a 29-yard field goal as time expired to lift the top-ranked Hawkeyes to victory over the #2 "Wolverdinks", as Houghtlin referred to them.

at Northwestern

Source: Box score and Game story
    
    
    
    
    
    
    
    
    

On a windy day in Evanston, Chuck Long went 19-26 for 399 yards and a Big Ten record-tying 6 TDs. Bill Happel hauled in three touchdowns, finishing with 117 yards on 5 receptions.

at No. 8 Ohio State

Source: Box score

Illinois

Source: Box score and Game story, 1985: The Unexpected Blowout

at Purdue

Source: Box score and Game story

Minnesota

Source: Box score and Game story
    
    
    
    
    
    
    

In the battle for the Floyd of Rosedale, Iowa beat the Golden Gophers in Lou Holtz's last game as Minnesota's head coach. Chuck Long, in his final game at Kinnick Stadium, became the first player in Big Ten history to eclipse 10,000 career passing yards.

vs. No. 13 UCLA (Rose Bowl)

Awards and honors
Chuck Long, Quarterback – Big Ten Player of the Year, Davey O'Brien Award, Maxwell Award, and Runner-up for the Heisman Trophy. Consensus First-team All-American.
Larry Station, Linebacker – Consensus First-team All-American.

Team players in the 1986 NFL Draft

Future head coaches

External links

References

Iowa
Iowa Hawkeyes football seasons
Big Ten Conference football champion seasons
Iowa Hawkeyes football